Adunni Oluwole (1905-1957) was a Nigerian pre-independence politician and human rights activist who vehemently opposed independence. She was born in Ibadan, Oyo State and was raised in Aroloya, Lagos State. She was an itinerant preacher whose talent in public speaking contributed to her fame. She delved into politics in 1954, and founded the Nigerian Commoners Liberal Party. She died in 1957 after a brief illness.

Early life and education 
Adunni Oluwole was born in Ibadan in 1905 to the family of an Ibadan warrior. After some family squabbles, her mother moved with her and her siblings to Aroloya, Lagos where they lived close to St. John's church. Adolphus Howells, the Vicar, contributed to the family's development while they remained in the area. She lived with Howells, who enrolled her in St. John's School, Aroloya. She however returned to her mother after her primary education.

From 1925 to 1932, Oluwole took part in leadership and dramatic roles in St. John's church. As a youth, she wrote a play for the Girl's Guild which was directed by the nationalist Herbert Macaulay. She went on to establish the first female-owned professional theater in Western Nigeria.

Oluwole soon after became an itinerant preacher. She vehemently opposed bringing dead bodies into the church for funerals, claiming to have seen a vision from God saying that He was God of the living not the dead. Her public speaking prowess gained her a vast audience and increased her popularity.

Political career 
Oluwole's foray into politics began with the general workers strike of 1945; moved by the plight of the poor, she supported the workers, mobilizing women supporters and donating monetary gifts though she was not a rich woman.

In 1954, she founded the Nigerian Commoners Liberal Party, the majority of whose members were men. Barely five months after it was established, it won a seat in Ikirun, Osun North, defeating the NCNC and AG.

Oluwole was an anti-independence activist and opposed the vote for independence when a date was first proposed in 1956. Her reasons were that the politicians who were given power abused it and were simply African colonialists. Her message resonated with the rural people and they came to be known among Yoruba-speaking groups as "Egbe Koyinbo Mailo" which translates to "The White Man Must Not Go". The party was short-lived as it had to be shut down due to low funding.

In 1955, she went before the Olubadan in Ibadan to air her political views, but she was shut down by Adegoke Adelabu who called her a harlot and threatened to hit her with broomsticks. She was later banished from Ibadan and relocated to Akure where she continued to spread her anti-independence message.

Oluwole was also an advocate for women's rights and she continuously demanded women's participation in politics in constitutional conferences.

References 

Nigerian women activists
Nigerian women writers
1905 births
1957 deaths
People from colonial Nigeria
Yoruba women in politics
Yoruba Christian clergy
Yoruba women activists
Women Christian clergy
Nigerian Christian clergy
People from Ibadan
20th-century Nigerian women politicians
Yoruba people
People from Oyo State